The disk covering problem asks for the smallest real number   such that  disks of radius  can be arranged in such a way as to cover the unit disk. Dually, for a given radius ε, one wishes to find the smallest integer n such that n disks of radius ε can cover the unit disk.

The best solutions known to date are as follows.

Method
The following picture shows an example of a dashed disk of radius 1 covered by six solid-line disks of radius ~0.6. One of the covering disks is placed central and the remaining five in a symmetrical way around it.

While this is not the best layout for r(6), similar arrangements of six, seven, eight, and nine disks around a central disk all having same radius result in the best layout strategies for r(7), r(8), r(9), and r(10), respectively. The corresponding angles θ are written in the "Symmetry" column in the above table.

References

External links

 Finch, S. R. "Circular Coverage Constants." §2.2 in Mathematical Constants. Cambridge, England: Cambridge University Press, pp. 484–489, 2003. 

Discrete geometry
Covering problems